The pigmy blue-tailed ameiva (Pholidoscelis lineolatus) is a species of lizard endemic to Hispaniola.

References

Pholidoscelis
Lizards of the Caribbean
Reptiles described in 1839
Reptiles of the Dominican Republic
Reptiles of Haiti
Endemic fauna of Hispaniola
Taxa named by André Marie Constant Duméril
Taxa named by Gabriel Bibron